Andrea Michelle Purica Guevara (born 21 November 1995) is a Venezuelan sprinter. She competed in the 100 metres event at the 2015 World Championships in Athletics in Beijing, China.

Competition record

Personal bests
Outdoor
100 metres – 11.29 (+1.5 m/s, Xalapa 2014)
200 metres – 24.13 (+0.4 m/s, Montevideo 2014)

Indoor
60 metres – 7.20 (ostrava- República Checa 2019)

References

External links
 

1995 births
Living people
Venezuelan female sprinters
World Athletics Championships athletes for Venezuela
Athletes (track and field) at the 2015 Pan American Games
Athletes (track and field) at the 2019 Pan American Games
Pan American Games competitors for Venezuela
Place of birth missing (living people)
Athletes (track and field) at the 2018 South American Games
South American Games gold medalists for Venezuela
South American Games medalists in athletics
Central American and Caribbean Games gold medalists for Venezuela
Competitors at the 2014 Central American and Caribbean Games
Competitors at the 2018 Central American and Caribbean Games
Central American and Caribbean Games medalists in athletics
South American Games gold medalists in athletics
20th-century Venezuelan women
21st-century Venezuelan women